Acari River is a river of Amazonas state in north-western Brazil.

Course

The river flows through the  Acari National Park created by president Dilma Rousseff in 2016 in the last week before her provisional removal from office.
It defines the eastern boundary of the  Juma Sustainable Development Reserve, created in 2006.
It joins the Sucunduri River from the left, and the downstream section is known as the Canumã River.

See also
List of rivers of Amazonas

References

Sources

Rivers of Amazonas (Brazilian state)